Honor of the Mounted is a 1932 American pre-Code Western film directed by Harry L. Fraser and starring Tom Tyler, Stanley Blystone and Francis McDonald.

It was given a second release by Astor Pictures in 1937.

Plot
A prisoner escapes from the Royal Canadian Mounted Police's Halliday when the constable is knocked out early in the film. Most of the story deals with the resulting chase.

Cast
 Tom Tyler as Constable Tom Halliday 
 Stanley Blystone as Scott Blakely, aka Carey 
 Francis McDonald as Jean Le Train 
 Gordon De Main as Corporal McCarty 
 Arthur Millett as Inspector Todd 
 William Dyer as U.S. Marshal Hatton 
 Celia Ryland as Irene Hatton 
 Theodore Lorch as Henchman 
 Charles King as Trapper Charlie

References

Bibliography
 Martin, Len D. The Allied Artists Checklist: The Feature Films and Short Subjects of Allied Artists Pictures Corporation, 1947-1978. McFarland & Company, 1993.

External links
 

1932 films
1932 Western (genre) films
1930s English-language films
American Western (genre) films
Films directed by Harry L. Fraser
American black-and-white films
Monogram Pictures films
Royal Canadian Mounted Police in fiction
Northern (genre) films
Films with screenplays by Harry L. Fraser
1930s American films